The North of England Championships and later known as the Rothmans Open North of England Championships (for sponsorship reasons), was a men's and women's grass court tennis tournament founded in 1884 as the North Yorkshire Tournament. It was mainly held at Scarborough, North Yorkshire, Great Britain from (1884–91, 1893–1903, 1905–1966, 1968).

It was also hosted at Kingston-upon-Hull (1892), then Harrogate (1904) and finally Hoylake (1967–69, 1970–74) when the event was discontinued.

History
The North Yorkshire Tournament was first staged in 1884 as North Yorkshire Tournament at the South Cliff Lawn Tennis Club at Scarborough, North Yorkshire. In 1886 its name was changed to the North of England Championships. It was for a long period a popular summer tournament in the British lawn tennis calendar. In 1910 it changed venue to be played at the Yorkshire Lawn Tennis Club through until 1966. The only other places to host the North of England Championships was at Kingston-upon-Hull in 1892, then Harrogate in 1904. In 1967 the event temporarily moved to Hoylake in what was then Cheshire, before returning to Scarborough the following year. In 1969 the championships moved permantly back to Hoylake until 1974 when it was abolished

Notable winners of the men's  singles included Ernest Browne (1886), Harry Sibthorpe Barlow, Laurie Doherty (1910), George Lyttleton Rogers (1937), Jaroslav Drobny (1949), Ashley Cooper (1958) and John Newcombe (1970).  Previous women's singles champions included Alice Simpson Pickering (1899), Dorothea Douglass(1901), Elizabeth Ryan (1919), Joan Hartigan (1934), Ann Haydon (1956), Virginia Wade (1967), Margaret Smith Court (1968), Billie Jean Moffitt King (1971) and Evonne Goolagong (1972).

Sponsorship
In 1968 at the start of the open era the championships were sponsored by the Liverpool Post and branded as the Liverpool Post North of England Championships. In 1969 the tobacco manufacturer Rothmans took over sponsorship and the event was then called the Rothmans Open North of England Championships until 1974.

See also
 North of England Hard Court Championships

References

Sources
 Jeffreys, Kevin (22 April 2021). "The Illustrious History of Tennis in Scarborough". on-magazine.co.uk. On: Yorkshire Magazine. Retrieved 4 October 2022.
 Lake, Robert J. (3 October 2014). A Social History of Tennis in Britain. Oxford: Routledge. ISBN 978-1-134-44557-8.

Grass court tennis tournaments
Defunct tennis tournaments in the United Kingdom
Tennis tournaments in England